TRT Avaz is a channel broadcast by the Turkish Radio and Television Corporation with focusing on Turkey and Balkans. It was launched in Turkey on March 21, 2009 and broadcasts throughout the Balkans, Turkic Central Asia, the Middle East, and the Caucasus.

Programs are televised in Azeri, Bosnian, Turkmen, Kazakh, Kyrgyz, and Uzbek with Turkish-language subtitles, and include documentaries, talk shows, culture and music programs as well as region-specific films and soap operas. Audiences also have the opportunity to learn Turkish through tutorials.

The channel's name was announced by President Abdullah Gül as "Avaz", a word that means "voice" in many Central Asian languages.

See also 

 Turkish Radio and Television Corporation
 List of television stations in Turkey

External links 

 TRT Avaz's Official Website 

International broadcasters
Television stations in Turkey
Turkish-language television stations
Television channels and stations established in 2009
2009 establishments in Turkey
Turkish Radio and Television Corporation